Dr. Wairimu Kiambuthi is a Kenyan academic and film director.

Early life and education 
Kiambuthi was born in Kenya. In 1999, she wrote her dissertation at Teachers College, Columbia University, titled "Increasing Gender Awareness in Northern Kenya Through a Video Curriculum"

Career
Kiambuthi was formerly a lecturer in Theatre Arts and Film Technology at Kenyatta University in Kenya and a media consultant at Columbia University in New York. Kiambuthi went on to direct the film Africans and African-Americans in the United States, a documentary released in 2006. The film aims to promote understanding between Africans in the United States and was featured at the African Film Festival in New York.

As of 2016, Kiambuthi is an instructor at Bellevue College in Washington.

Filmography
 Africans and African-Americans in the United States (2006)

References 

Living people
Kenyan film directors
Academic staff of Kenyatta University
Bellevue College
Columbia University people
Year of birth missing (living people)